Dendeng refers to thinly sliced dried meat in Indonesian cuisine. It is preserved through a mixture of sugar and spices and dried via a frying process. It is similar to jerky. The creation of dendeng is commonly credited to the Minangkabau people, and their earliest dendeng was made from beef, dried so it would be preserved for days and could be taken along with them when they traveled.

The Padang cuisine version—probably the most popular dendeng dish in Indonesia—is called dendeng balado or dendeng batokok, and is a speciality from Padang, West Sumatra, made from beef which is thinly cut then dried and fried before adding chillies and other ingredients.

Variations
The most common version of dendeng found in Indonesia is dendeng sapi (beef dendeng), and it usually has a sweetness from the inclusion of caramelized coconut sugar. However, versions made from other exotic meats are also available, especially in Eastern Indonesia. Dendeng rusa (deer dendeng) can be found in the Nusa Tenggara islands and Papua. Indonesian Chinese favor the similar dried pork dish known as bakkwa.

See also

 Padang cuisine
 Rendang

References
 Dendeng Balado

Beef dishes
Padang cuisine
Indonesian beef dishes